Stanislav Manolev (born 16 December 1985) is a Bulgarian retired professional footballer who played as a right back.

Club career

Pirin 1922
Manolev started to play football for Pirin 1922.

Litex Lovech
In early 2005 he moved to Litex. Manolev won The National Cup in 2008 with Litex. In the final on 21 May 2008 against Cherno More Varna, Manolev scored the only goal after 53 minutes. Next year, Litex won the cup again. The event took place on 26 May 2009.

PSV Eindhoven
On 25 July 2009, Manolev signed a 3+2 years contract with the Dutch club PSV Eindhoven, to fend competitions from Aston Villa. On 6 August 2009, Manolev made his official debut for PSV Eindhoven. He was selected as a starter against Bulgarian club Cherno More in the UEFA Europa League 3rd qualification round. Unluckily for him he was sent off for a second bookable offense in the 44th minute of the game, but his team went on to repeat its 1–0 win from the first leg.

On 9 August 2009, Manolev made his full debut for PSV Eindhoven in the Eredivisie. He played 69 minutes before being substituted for Jan Kromkamp, assisting Balázs Dzsudzsák's equalizing goal and earning himself a booking. On 16 August 2009, Manolev played the full 90 minutes of PSV's 4–3 home win against AFC Ajax and assisted Otman Bakkal's decisive goal in the 75th minute of the game.
On 23 August 2009, Manolev had another fine display, assisting two PSV goals in the 3–1 home win against NAC Breda. On 12 September 2009, he scored his first goal in the 3–0 home win against Roda JC. On 28 October 2009, Manolev scored his second goal for PSV against Roda JC for a match from the KNVB Cup. On 14 April 2010, Manolev scored his second league goal in the 2–2 draw with Heerenveen.

In the 2011–12 season, Manolev signed a new contract with PSV until 2014. In the summer transfer window in 2012, Manolev was linked around Europe, with VfB Stuttgart and Sporting Lisbon.

Subsequently, his performance at PSV led to him being branded as "the worst right back in Europe" by RTL pundits, such as René van der Gijp, having become his outspoken critics since his arrival. Despite this, Manolev refused to bow down to the careless criticism he received, being quoted as saying: "I do not look at it and I do not make me worry about," said Manolev then. "This man (ed. Van der Gijp) is paid to give his opinion, fine. I look good at the Bulgarian television."

Upon his loan spell ended from Fulham, having lost a first team place to Santiago Arias and Joshua Brenet. PSV would allow Manolev to leave the club on free transfer, as well leaving on cheap basis. After a failed move in the summer transfer window, Manolev was then sent to the reserve team and went on to make ten appearances, scoring once.

In the January transfer window, Manolev left the club by mutual consent, with just six month left to his contract after the club did not display an interest to extend his contract.

Fulham (loan)
Manolev signed for Premier League side Fulham on loan until the end of the season on 31 January 2013.

On 9 February 2013, Manolev made his debut in a 0–0 draw against Norwich City. In a 1–0 loss against Arsenal on 20 April 2013, Manolev was fouled by Olivier Giroud, who later got sent-off in the 85th minute. Manolev made five league appearances and returned to PSV despite hopes of joining Fulham on a permanent basis. After his loan spell finished, Manolev expressed he was "delighted to be given a chance to play for Fulham".

Kuban Krasnodar

After being released by PSV, Manolev moved to Russia by joining Kuban Krasnodar, where he will join up teammate Ivelin Popov. Manolev made his debut in a 1–1 draw against Dynamo Moscow. He scored his first goal for the club in a 4–0 win against Krylia Sovetov, netting the first goal of the game. The assist came from fellow Bulgarian teammate Ivelin Popov.

Dynamo Moscow
On 18 June 2014, Manolev signed a contract with Dynamo Moscow as a free agent.

CSKA Sofia
Manolev played for CSKA Sofia between September 2016 and February 2019.

Ludogorets Razgrad
In February 2019, Manolev signed a one-and-a-half year contract with reigning champions Ludogorets Razgrad. He won two national titles with the Razgrad-based team before leaving in July 2020.

Pirin Blagoevgrad
In the summer of 2020 he joined Pirin Blagoevgrad from his hometown. In August 2021, Manolev was accused of racism by CSKA Sofia player Amos Youga. He was subsequently banned for 5 matches, but on appeal the punishment for racism was dropped, with the player instead ordered to serve a 3-match suspension for general insults directed at the opponent. He officially retired on 21 May 2022, when he played his last match against Botev Vratsa, when he was substituted in the 11th minute, his playing number for the most of his career.

International career
Manolev started his career for the Bulgarian national football team during the World Cup 2010 qualifiers.
In August 2008, the Bulgarian national coach Plamen Markov called Stanislav in Bulgaria national football team in a match against Bosnia and Herzegovina national football team. Manolev made his official debut and Bulgaria won the match as a guest. Manolev was a part of the Bulgaria national football team in the World Cup 2010 qualifiers against Italy and Montenegro, but remained an unused substitute. He played 45 minutes in the second half of the friendly between Bulgaria and Serbia in November 2008. He was in the starting 11 in the next two games against the Republic of Ireland and Cyprus. He scored his first goal for Bulgaria in a 2014 FIFA World Cup qualification match against Italy that finished 2–2.

On 28 March 2015, Manolev made an assist for the Bulgarian national team during a 2–2 draw with Italy. On 31 August 2017 he scored his first international goal in more than four years for the historical 3–2 home win against Sweden.

Career statistics

Club

International

Scores and results list Bulgaria's goal tally first, score column indicates score after each Manolev goal.

Honours
Litex Lovech
Bulgarian Cup (2): 2008, 2009
PSV Eindhoven
KNVB Cup (1): 2012
Ludogorets
First League (1): 2018–19
Bulgarian Supercup (1): 2019
Pirin Blagoevgrad
Second League (1): 2020–21

References

External links 

 
 

1985 births
Living people
Bulgarian footballers
Bulgaria under-21 international footballers
Bulgaria international footballers
PFC Pirin Blagoevgrad players
PFC Litex Lovech players
PSV Eindhoven players
Jong PSV players
Fulham F.C. players
FC Dynamo Moscow players
FC Kuban Krasnodar players
FC Tom Tomsk players
PFC CSKA Sofia players
PFC Ludogorets Razgrad players
PFC Ludogorets Razgrad II players
OFC Pirin Blagoevgrad players
First Professional Football League (Bulgaria) players
Second Professional Football League (Bulgaria) players
Eredivisie players
Eerste Divisie players
Premier League players
Russian Premier League players
Bulgarian expatriate footballers
Expatriate footballers in the Netherlands
Expatriate footballers in England
Expatriate footballers in Russia
Bulgarian expatriate sportspeople in the Netherlands
Association football defenders
Sportspeople from Blagoevgrad